Ignacio Antonio Saavedra Pino (born 12 January 1999) is a Chilean professional footballer who plays as a midfielder for Chilean club Universidad Católica.

Club career

Beginnings
Ignacio was born into a family linked to sports. At six years old, he started participating in the Colo-Colo Academy, and at 13 he moved to the youth ranks of rivals Universidad Católica. His talents quickly caught the attention of both club and nation, getting called up to the Chile U20 squad.

Universidad Católica
After the arrival of the Spanish coach Beñat San José, Saavedra made his professional debut on August 4, 2018 in a match against Everton. He played 88 minutes in a 2-1 win. From there on, he has mantained a steady flux of starts in the defensive midfield position, amassing 131 official career appearances with the club.

International career
He represented Chile U17 at the 2015 FIFA U-17 World Cup, reaching the second stage and proving his reliability by playing all the matches. At under-20 level, Saavedra represented Chile in the 2018 South American Games, winning the gold medal.

At senior level, after being called up to some training microcycles by both Reinaldo Rueda and Martín Lasarte, making his international debut in the friendly match against Bolivia on March 26, 2021, at the 87th minute.

Career statistics

Club

International

Honours
Universidad Católica
 Primera División: 2018, 2019, 2020, 2021
 Supercopa de Chile: 2019, 2020, 2021

Chile U20
 South American Games Gold medal: 2018

References

External links
 

1999 births
Living people
Footballers from Santiago
Chilean footballers
Chile youth international footballers
Chile under-20 international footballers
Chile international footballers
Association football midfielders
Chilean Primera División players
Club Deportivo Universidad Católica footballers
South American Games gold medalists for Chile
South American Games medalists in football
Competitors at the 2018 South American Games
21st-century Chilean people